is a former Nippon Professional Baseball outfielder.

External links

 Career statistics - NPB.jp 
 88 Koichi Sekikawa PLAYERS2021 - Fukuoka SoftBank Hawks Official site

1969 births
Living people
Baseball people from Tokyo
Japanese baseball players
Komazawa University alumni
Nippon Professional Baseball outfielders
Hanshin Tigers players
Chunichi Dragons players
Tohoku Rakuten Golden Eagles players
Japanese baseball coaches
Nippon Professional Baseball coaches